Seeduwa Raddoluwa was a first-class cricket club based in Seeduwa, Sri Lanka. In 2011, the team was renamed Sri Lanka Ports Authority Cricket Club.

History
Seeduwa Raddoluwa joined the revamped Sri Lankan first-class competition in the 2008–09 season, becoming the 32nd team to take part in the competition. They played in the 2008–09, 2009–10 and 2010–11 seasons.

They played 27 matches, with 11 wins, 6 losses and 10 draws.

Team records
 Highest team total - 391	vs Police Sports Club, 2009–10
 Best innings bowling figures - TMUS Karunaratne 7/146 vs Singha, 2009–10
 Highest individual score - WWP Taraka 127 vs Police Sports Club, 2008–09
 Partnership records -
 1st - 81  SD Jayathilake & TMUS Karunaratne vs PSC, Colombo (PPS), 2009–10
 2nd - 68* TMUS Karunaratne & WKG Dilruk vs SLAF, Colombo (AF), 2009–10
 3rd - 170 HG Kumara &	KM Fernando vs Navy, Colombo, 2009–10
 4th - 102 WBH Samarawickrame & TMUS Karunaratne vs Navy, Welisara, 2009–10 	
 5th - 132 TMUS Karunaratne & KM Fernando vs PSC, Colombo (PPS), 2009–10
 6th -	151 WBH Samarawickrame & DGR Dhammika vs BRC, Colombo, 2008–09
 7th - 104 HG Kumara &	AVS Nikethana vs BRC, Colombo,	2009–10
 8th - 72  DGR Dhammika & WKG Dilruk vs Saracens, Colombo (RSC), 2008–09
 8th - 72  WKG Dilruk & HG Kumara vs SLAF, Colombo, 2008–09
 9th - 61  JDM de Silva & KMP Kumara vs LCC, Colombo, 2009–10
 10th - 55 WBH Samarawickrame & WKG Dilruk vs Seb, Katunayake-FTZ, 2008/09

References

External links
Seeduwa Raddoluwa Cricket Club at CricketArchive

Former senior cricket clubs of Sri Lanka